Asja Zenere (born 13 December 1996) is an Italian alpine skier.

Career
During her career, she has achieved one result among the top 15 in the FIS Alpine Ski World Cup.

World Cup results
Top 15

References

External links
 
 

1996 births
Living people
Italian female alpine skiers
Alpine skiers of Centro Sportivo Carabinieri